Smbat I (c. 850–912/14) was the second king of the medieval Kingdom of Armenia of the Bagratuni dynasty, and son of Ashot I. He is the father of Ashot II (known as Ashot Yerkat) and Abas I.

Rule
Smbat I was crowned king in 892 in Shirakavan (Yerazgavors), following a brief attempt by his uncle Abas to disrupt his succession to the throne. Smbat continued his father's policy of maintaining cordial relations with the Byzantine Empire but remained mindful of the Arabs' fears of the Armeno-Byzantine alliance. Speaking with the Arab ostikan (governor) Muhammad Ibn Abi'l-Saj (Afshin), Smbat convinced him that the alliance would not only be for the dual benefit of Byzantium and Armenia but would also work to the economic favor of the Arabs. Smbat also achieved a major victory when on April 21, 892, he recaptured the former Armenian capital of Dvin from the Arabs. In some of these endeavors Smbat received strong support from his neighbor to the north, Adarnase IV of Iberia.

Smbat's successes shortly came to a halt when Afshin decided that he could not countenance a powerful Armenia so close to his domains. He retook Dvin and managed to take Smbat's wife as a hostage until she was released in exchange for Smbat's son Mushegh, and his nephew also called Smbat. The wars against Armenia continued even after Afshin's death in 901, when his brother Yusuf Ibn Abi'l-Saj became ostikan of Arminiya. While Yusuf's reign was not immediately hostile, Smbat committed a series of blunders that led to several of his allies to turn their backs on him: having sought to placate his eastern ally, Smbat of Syunik', by ceding to him Nakhichevan city, Smbat inadvertently drove Gagik Artsruni of Vaspurakan into Yusuf's arms since the city was a part of Gagik's domains. Yusuf took advantage of this feud by awarding Gagik a crown in 908, thus making him King Gagik I of Vaspurakan and creating an Armenian state opposed to the one led by Smbat.

As Yusuf began a new campaign against Smbat in conjunction with Gagik in 909, neither the Byzantines nor the Abbasid caliph, Yusuf's nominal sovereign, sent aid to Smbat; several Armenian princes also chose to withhold their support. Those who did ally with Smbat were brutally dealt with by Yusuf: Smbat's son Mushegh, his nephew Smbat, and Grigor II of Western Syunik were all poisoned.

Death
Yusuf's army ravaged the rest of Armenia as it advanced toward Berd Kapoyt (Blue Fortress), where Smbat had taken refuge, and besieged it for some time. Smbat finally decided to surrender himself to Yusuf in 914 in hopes of ending the Arab onslaught; Yusuf, however, showed no compassion toward his prisoner as he brought him to Yernjak, tortured the Armenian king to death, beheaded him, and put the headless body on display on a cross in Dvin. Smbat's contemporary, Hovhannes Draskhanakerttsi, writes that the ground where the crucifix was raised became a site for pilgrimage for both Christians and non-Christians. Information provided by later Armenian authors suggested that Smbat's body was taken down and brought to the monastery at Artsvanist.

References

850s births
910s deaths
Year of birth uncertain
Year of death uncertain
Bagratuni dynasty
Kings of Bagratid Armenia
10th-century monarchs in Asia
9th-century rulers in Asia
9th-century Armenian people
10th-century Armenian people
Executed monarchs
Oriental Orthodox monarchs